Life as a House is a 2001 American drama film produced and directed by Irwin Winkler. The screenplay by Mark Andrus focuses on a man who is anxious to repair his relationship with his ex-wife and teenaged son after he is diagnosed with terminal cancer.

Plot
George Monroe, a jaded architectural model fabricator, is living the bachelor's life in the old family shack on the coast of California. Over the years, George has been avoiding getting up to modern CAD technology standards and eventually is fired from the architecture firm. When the principal owner refuses to let George keep a few of his models, he destroys all but one of the models with a roll of design plans. As he exits the building with the remaining model, he collapses and is rushed to the hospital, where it is revealed he has advanced stage cancer and any treatment would be futile.

George, with a time limit on his life, decides to demolish the shack left to him by his father and build his own custom house. He enlists his son, Sam, who is alienated from his stepfather Peter and his mother Robin, who has since been remarried to a wealthy investor. Sam is forced to spend his summer with George, who has not revealed his terminal condition, and help him with the house. Initially, Sam makes it a point not to help George demo the old house. When George refuses to give Sam money unless he works for it, Sam toys with becoming a prostitute, but is nearly caught and flees from his first encounter. This leads him to steal George's Vicodin.

George slowly reconnects with Sam. Robin decides to assist as well, and she finds herself rediscovering George. Also joining in the construction are Alyssa, Sam's classmate who lives next door with her mother Colleen; local policeman Kurt Walker, George's childhood friend; Sam's young half-brothers Adam and Ryan; various neighbors; and eventually Peter, even after separating from Robin when she tells him that her feelings for George have re-awakened. George tells Robin of his disease, sending her into shock. George tells Sam, who feels betrayed and accuses George of being selfish and takes refuge at Alyssa's house. George collapses and is found by Robin the following morning. Complications arise when neighbor David Dokos tries to halt construction because the building's height exceeds the allowable limit by six inches. His plans to halt the project are stopped by Sam, who recognizes him from his prostitution attempt and blackmails him.

Sam puts Christmas lights all over the unfinished house and shows George the gleaming house from his hospital window. The next morning, Sam returns to finish the house and Robin sits beside George until his death. Robin goes to the house and tells Sam about his father's death. Sam inherits the house he finished building.  Sam gives the property to a woman who has been living in a trailer park.  As a girl, she was injured in a car crash caused by his grandfather.

Cast
 Kevin Kline as George Monroe
 Kristin Scott Thomas as Robin Kimball
 Hayden Christensen as Sam Monroe
 Jena Malone as Alyssa Beck
 Mary Steenburgen as Colleen Beck
 Jamey Sheridan as Peter Kimball
 Ian Somerhalder as Josh
 Scott Bakula as Kurt Walker
 Sam Robards as David Dokos 
 John Pankow as Bryan Burke 
 Mike Weinberg as Adam Kimball
 Scotty Leavenworth as Ryan Kimball

Production
In Character Building: Inside Life as a House, a bonus feature on the DVD release of the film, director Irwin Winkler confesses he never realized the rekindling love between George and Robin was a key aspect of the script until he saw the emotion displayed by Kevin Kline and Kristin Scott Thomas in their scenes together. Winkler encouraged his cast to improvise moments leading into and following their scripted dialogue, many of which were included in the final film.

In From the Ground Up, another DVD bonus feature, production designer Dennis Washington discusses how he was required to construct an entire street of houses leading to Sam's house, which was perched on a cliff overlooking the Pacific Ocean in Palos Verdes, California. The new house was built on another site, then dismantled and transported to the film set as each section was needed. Because the film tracked the progress of the dismantling of the old house and the construction of the new one, it had to be shot in sequence. When the film was completed, the house was dismantled, moved, reconstructed, and enlarged to become a library for the Kenter Canyon Elementary School in Brentwood.

An official soundtrack containing Mark Isham’s original score was released on October 30, 2001. The film includes the songs "What You Wish For" and "Rainy Day" by Guster, "That's the Way" by Gob, "Live a Lie" and "Somewhere" by Default, "Sweet Dreams" by Marilyn Manson, "Water" by ohGr, "Re-Arranged" by Limp Bizkit, "Both Sides Now" by Joni Mitchell, "Gramercy Park" by Deadsy, and "How to Disappear Completely" by Radiohead.

Release 
The film premiered at the Toronto International Film Festival and was shown at the Boston Film Festival before going into limited release in the US on October 26, 2001.

Reception
Life as a House received mixed reviews from critics. The review aggregator website Rotten Tomatoes reported that 47% of critics have given the film a positive review based on 106 reviews, with an average rating of 5.27/10. The site's critics consensus reads, "A manipulative tearjerker, Life as a House benefits from fine performances from the cast." On Metacritic, the film has a weighted average score of 45 out of 100 based on 32 critics, indicating "mixed or average reviews".

Stephen Holden of The New York Times wrote “‘Life as a House,’ directed by Mr. Winkler from a screenplay by Mark Andrus, certainly means well, and its be-here-now philosophy is unarguably valuable. But as it follows George's final months during a summer in which he forms a solid bond with his estranged son, it doesn't trust the audience enough to keep from laying on the schmaltz.”

Roger Ebert gave the film two-and-a-half stars, noting “some episodes in the movie seem especially contrived.” However, he praised the performances of Kline and Thomas, saying the actors “are able to deepen their characters by sheer skill and depth of technique, so that we like them and care what happens to them.”

Despite the film's mixed reception, Christensen's performance received widespread praise. In a review for Entertainment Weekly, Lisa Schwarzbaum said “Christensen — soon to hit pinup status in ”Star Wars” II and III as Anakin Skywalker — is a joy to watch, but when he’s not on screen, this movie is less instructive about the tools of life than any episode of ”This Old House.”

Box office
The film opened in twenty-nine theaters in the US and grossed $294,056 on its opening weekend. It eventually earned $15,667,270 in the US and $8,236,521 in foreign markets for a total worldwide box office of $23,903,791.

Awards and nominations

Home media
New Line Home Entertainment released the film on DVD on March 26, 2002. It includes commentary by director/producer Irwin Winkler, producer Rob Cowan, and screenwriter Mark Andrus, as well as deleted  scenes (one with William Russ, who was originally cast as Kurt Walker but replaced when he was injured in a motorcycle accident after filming began).

References

External links

2001 films
2001 drama films
American drama films
Films set in California
Films directed by Irwin Winkler
Films about cancer
Films produced by Irwin Winkler
Films scored by Mark Isham
Films about father–son relationships
Films about families
2000s English-language films
2000s American films